Latifa is a feminine given name, of Arabic origins.

Latifa or Latifah may also refer to:

 Latifa (singer) (Latifa Bint Alaya El Arfaoui, born 1961), Tunisian pop music singer
 Latifa School for Girls, in Dubai
 Latifa, an organ of spiritual perception in Naqshbandi
 Queen Latifah (Dana Elaine Owens, born 1970), American singer, actress and producer
 Latifa Al Maktoum (disambiguation), the name of several princesses from Dubai
 Latifa (Sufism), concept of Islamic sufism

See also 

 Latif (disambiguation)
 Latife, a Turkish name